Jevon Groves is a rugby union player. His usual position is back row forward.

Groves played for Cardiff RFC, Glamorgan Wanderers RFC and Cross Keys RFC.

He made his debut for Newport Gwent Dragons against the Ospreys 7 May 2010 as a second-half replacement. 
Groves was offered a new contract by Newport Gwent Dragons in May 2014 but chose to move on.

In the 2016–17 season, he joined Hong Kong Football Club (rugby section), playing in the Hong Kong Premiership.

International
He is a Wales Under 19 and Under 20 international. Groves captained the Wales Sevens team for the 2010 Commonwealth Games rugby sevens tournament

References

External links
Newport Gwent Dragons profile

1988 births
Rugby union players from Pontypridd
Living people
Dragons RFC players
Cross Keys RFC players
Welsh rugby union players
Rugby sevens players at the 2014 Commonwealth Games
Commonwealth Games rugby sevens players of Wales
Rugby sevens players at the 2010 Commonwealth Games